Banner-making is the ancient art or craft of sewing banners. Techniques used include applique, embroidery, fabric painting, patchwork and others.

Trade union banners

In the United Kingdom, the first of these banners were sometimes painted by local signwriters, coachpainters or decorators. More often than not, they were made by a member of the local branch who was considered to be artistic. However, from 1837 onwards, more than three quarters were made by the firm of George Tutill of Chesham in Buckinghamshire. All their banners were made from pure silk woven by Huguenots in London. At the height of banner production there were said to be 17,000 looms in operation.

The silk was stretched taut over a wooden frame and coated with India rubber, and the oil colours applied to it were 'old', i.e. had been standing around for a while. This allowed the paint to dry quickly and to make it more pliant or elastic.

There were many designs from the Bible (e.g. David slaying Goliath), from heraldry or from popular tradition, e.g. the "all-seeing eye", or symbols of truth, hope or justice.

Present

With the advent of Conservative governments in Britain after the 1979 general election, trades union banners lost their popularity, and many languished in damp cellars or lofts. Additionally the large number of trade union mergers (see for example UNISON and Amicus) meant that many banners no longer had the correct union name on and became obsolete. In the last 10 years or so, the interest in these banners has been rekindled, and many books, videos, postcards and the like have been produced to help people rediscover and celebrate this part of the history of working men and women.

Durham Miners Gala is probably the largest current parade of trade union banners.

There are special museums which restore, preserve and exhibit trade union banners, e.g. the People's History Museum in Manchester and Beamish Museum in the North East.

Church banners
Design is all-important in a banner for ecclesiastical use. The banner maker needs a sound knowledge of religious symbolism and iconography. There is also the question of its use, i.e. indoor or outdoor. If outdoor, it needs weatherproofing and must be able to be carried. Whether indoor or outdoor, proper storage provision must be made. The types of material can vary from vinyl to cloth.

References

Embroidery
Textile arts
Textile techniques